Knowles is an English surname of Old English origin. This is a locality name meaning 'at the knoll,' a hill or summit, derived from Old English word cnolle or Middle English knol, meaning hilltop and thus describes a person who lived at such a place. It can also be an Anglicized version of the Irish name Ó Tnúthghail. It may refer to many people. Variants of this surname include Knollys, Knolles, Knoll, Knowle, Noll, Noel, and Nowell.

A
Albert Knowles, British trade union leader
Albert Knowles (footballer) (1871–1950), English footballer
Alison Knowles (born 1933), American artist
Anne Kelly Knowles (born 1957), American geographer
Angus Knowles-Cutler (born 1962), British politician

B
Bernard Knowles (1900–1975), English film director
Beyoncé Knowles-Carter (born 1981), American R&B singer and actress
Barry Knowles (born 1965), Liverpool Football Club supporter and "Spirit of Shankly" (Liverpool FC Supporters Union) member from Dudley, West Midlands

C
Cameron Knowles (born 1982), New Zealand footballer
Carl Knowles (1910–1981), American basketball player
Admiral of the White Sir Charles Knowles, 1st Baronet (1704–1777) (see Knowles Baronets)
Admiral of the Red Sir Charles Knowles, 2nd Baronet (1754–1831)
Chris Knowles, English footballer
Christopher Knowles (born 1959), American poet
Christopher Knowles (comics), American comic book artist and writer
Clayton Knowles, New York Times correspondent
Conrad Knowles (1810–1844), Australian actor
Craig Knowles (born 1959), Australian politician
Cyril Knowles (1944–1991), an English association football player
Cyril Knowles (rugby league) (1915–1957), an English rugby league footballer player, father of the association football player
Cyril J. Knowles (1905–1961), a British cinematographer

D
Darold Knowles (born 1941), former Major League Baseball pitcher
David Knowles (1896–1974), English Benedictine monk
Davy Knowles (born 1987), British blues guitarist and singer
Dick Knowles (1917–2008), British politician
Durward Knowles (1917–2018), Olympic sailor from the Bahamas

E
Edward Knowles (Royal Navy officer) (1744 – c. 1761), British naval officer
Edward P. Knowles (1805–1881), Mayor of Providence, Rhode Island 
Eric Knowles (born 1953), British antiques expert

F
Freeman T. Knowles (1846–1910), American Populist Party politician

G
Graeme Paul Knowles (born 1951), Dean of St. Paul's Cathedral, London
George Knowles (1882–1947), Australian public servant and lawyer
George Beauchamp Knowles (1790–1862), English botanist

H
 Harriet Knowles (fl. 1845), the first actress in Australia
Harry Knowles (born 1971), online film critic
Herbert Knowles (1798–1817), English poet
Horace G. Knowles (1863–1937), American attorney
Horace J Knowles (1884–1954), author and illustrator
Hugh S. Knowles (1904–1988), American acoustical engineer, inventor, and manufacturer

J
James Knowles, convicted of murdering Michael Donald in 1981
James Hinton Knowles (1856–1943), British Missionary to Kashmir
James Thomas Knowles (1831–1908) (1831–1908), British architect and literary editor
James Sheridan Knowles (1784–1862), Irish dramatist and actor
James Thomas Knowles (1806–1884), British architect and father of Sir James Knowles
Jeremy R. Knowles (1935–2008), chemistry professor at Harvard University
Jeremy Knowles (swimmer) (born 1981), Bahamian swimmer
Jesse Knowles (1919–2006), American businessman and politician
Jo-Anne Knowles (born 1971), English actress
John Evans Knowles (1914–2011), Canadian politician
John Knowles (1926–2001), American author
Julian Knowles (born 1965), Australian composer

K
Karen Knowles (born 1964), Australian singer and entertainer

L
Sir Lees Knowles, 1st Baronet (1857–1928), British barrister, historian, philanthropist and Conservative politician
Sir Leonard Joseph Knowles (1915–1999), first Chief Justice of The Bahamas
Linda Knowles (born 1946), former British high jumper

M
Mabel Knowles
Malcolm Knowles (1913–1997), American theorist in adult education
Mark Knowles (born 1971), professional Bahamian tennis player
Mark Knowles (born 1984), Australian field hockey player
Martin Knowles, English dubstep musician known as Emalkay
Mathew Knowles (born 1951), father of Beyoncé and Solange Knowles
Matilda Cullen Knowles (1864–1933), lichenologist
Matt Knowles (born 1974), American professional wrestler
Michael Knowles:
Michael Knowles (actor), English actor and scriptwriter, best known for his role as 'Captain Jonathan Ashwood', in the 1970s sitcom 'It Ain't Half Hot Mum'
Michael Knowles (politician) (born 1942), British Conservative Member of Parliament for Nottingham East

N
Nick Knowles (born 1962), British television presenter

O
Oliver Knowles, instrumentalist for the music group Snow Ghosts

P
Patric Knowles (1911–1995), English actor
Paul John Knowles (1946–1974), American serial killer
Peter Knowles (born 1945), former English footballer

R
Ralph Knowles (born 1945), American attorney
Richard Brinsley Knowles (1820–1882), British journalist
Richard George Knowles (1858–1919), Canadian-American comedian and singer, popular in British music halls
Ryan Knowles (born 1978), American actor and comedian

S
Sheena Knowles, Australian children's author
Solange Knowles (born 1986), pop/soul singer, actress, model (Beyoncé Knowles's younger sister) 
Sonny Knowles (born 1932), Irish singer
Stanley Knowles (1908–1997), Canadian politician
Stan Knowles (1931–2017), Australian politician
Sydney Knowles, British frogman in World War II
Sue Knowles (born 1951), retired Australian politician

T
Tony Knowles (chemist), former president of the British Columbia Institute of Technology
Tony Knowles (politician) (born 1943), American Democratic politician
Tony Knowles (snooker player) (born 1955), English professional snooker player

W
Warren P. Knowles (1903–1993), American lawyer and politician
William David Knowles (1908–2000), Canadian politician
William Erskine Knowles (1872–1951), Canadian politician
William Standish Knowles (1917–2012), American chemist

See also

Knowles Baronets, two Baronetcies created in the Baronetage of Great Britain and the United Kingdom
Knollys (surname)
Knollys family
Knowle (disambiguation), includes list of people with surname Knowle
Knoll (surname)
Noll, surname
Noel (surname)
Nowell (surname)

References

Surnames
English-language surnames
Surnames of Irish origin
Cornish-language surnames

de:Knowles
fr:Knowles
pt:Knowles